Kobold Quarterly was a roleplaying game magazine created by Wolfgang Baur and published by Open Design LLC.

Content
Kobold Quarterly was published four times a year and focused on the Dungeons & Dragons role-playing game system. The headquarters of the magazine was in Kirkland, Washington.

The magazine occupied the gaming market niche once served by the Dungeon and Dragon magazines, and included interviews with game designers as well as supplemental game material. As of 2011, the magazine had three editors, including editor-in-chief Wolfgang Baur.

Publication history
On May 21, 2007, before Paizo Publishing's publication of their final print magazine — Dragon #359 (September 2007) — Wolfgang Baur announced that he was working on a new magazine for gamers, and Open Design soon published the first issue of the 3.5E/d20 magazine Kobold Quarterly (Summer 2007). The first issue of the magazine was published in 2007. The small print run of Kobold Quarterly #1 sold out in September, and Kobold Quarterly #2 (Fall 2007) was printed in full-color and was produced in larger quantities and made available in game stores.

Kobold Quarterly #23 (Fall 2012) was produced in October 2012, and on November 16, 2012, Baur announced that he was closing down the magazine. The magazine ended publication with issue #23, Fall 2012.

Reception
The magazine has won multiple ENnie Awards.

References

External links
 
 Kobold Press - About webpage (Kobold Quarterly's publisher)

Defunct magazines published in the United States
ENnies winners
Magazines disestablished in 2012
Magazines established in 2007
Magazines published in Washington (state)
Quarterly magazines published in the United States
Role-playing game magazines